Ogouloye Appolinaire Danvidé (born 15 April 1993) is a Beninese footballer who plays for Heartland, as a defender.

Club career
Danvidé began his career in 2009 with Soleil FC, before joining Cavaliers de Nikki in 2011.

Professional career
He earned a move to Nigerien side AS Douanes (Niamey) in 2013 ahead of the 2014–2015 season. He left in October 2017.

On 7 October 2017, he joined Ivorian side Séwé Sport on a one-year deal.

He joined Congolese club TP Mazembe on trial in July 2018, but failed to sign a contract due to monetary agreement.

AS Otôho
It was announced on 24 January 2019 that Danvidé had signed for Congolese club, AS Otôho, on a one-year deal for an undisclosed fee, with a negotiation clause for a further year. He featured in the club second round matches in CAF Confederation Cup.

International career
Danvidé was born to Beninese parents, which grants him the right to play for Benin or the Ivory Coast.

He was called up to the national side for the very first time in 2014. He made the 23-man squad to face Malawi at Stade de l’Amitié on 20 July 2014, ahead of the first leg match of the AFCON 2015 qualifier.

References

External links

Superkoora : Player profile

Living people
1993 births
Beninese footballers
Beninese expatriate footballers
Benin international footballers
Ivorian footballers
Ivorian people of Beninese descent
Sportspeople of Beninese descent
Séwé Sport de San-Pédro players
AS Otôho players
Heartland F.C. players
Association football defenders
Beninese expatriate sportspeople in Nigeria
Beninese expatriate sportspeople in the Republic of the Congo
Expatriate footballers in Niger
Expatriate footballers in Nigeria
Expatriate footballers in the Republic of the Congo